An Imitation Of Love was the first album from Millie Jackson on Jive/RCA, with which she signed in 1985. "Hot! Wild! Unrestricted! Crazy Love" and "Love Is a Dangerous Game" were both singles that became Top 10 Hits on the Hot R&B/Hip-Hop Singles and Tracks Chart. The Album indeed reached #119 on the Billboard Album Charts and #16 on the R&B Charts. The album was re-issued on CD in 2013 by the Funkytowngrooves label, remastered and with bonus tracks.

Track listings
"Hot! Wild! Unrestricted! Crazy Love" (Millie Jackson, Timmy Allen) (5:58)
"Wanna Be Your Lover" (Prince) (5:54)
"I Fell in Love" (Millie Jackson, Timmy Allen) (6:18)
"An Imitation of Love" (Jolyon Skinner, Jonathan Butler, Millie Jackson) (4:12)
"Love is a Dangerous Game" (Jolyon Skinner, Jonathan Butler, Leslie Charles, Wayne Brathwaite) (5:58)
"It´s a Thang" (Larry Smith, Millie Jackson) (5:12)
"I Need To Be Myself" (Jolyon Skinner, Jonathan Butler, Phillip Mitchell) (5:36)
"Mind Over Matter" (Millie Jackson, Timmy Allen) (5:10)

Charts

Weekly charts

Year-end charts

References

Further reading
Millie Jackson at "Discogs"
[ Allmusic Guide page]

1986 albums
Millie Jackson albums
Jive Records albums
Albums produced by Larry Smith (producer)